Coleophora necessaria is a moth of the family Coleophoridae. It is found in southern Russia and Turkey.

The larvae feed on Alyssum turkestanicum. They feed on the leaves and later the fruits of their host plant.

References

necessaria
Moths described in 1880
Moths of Europe
Moths of Asia